The Geneva Farm Golf Course is located in Harford County, Maryland, USA.

See also

References

Golf clubs and courses in Maryland
Buildings and structures in Harford County, Maryland